The Church of Saint Peter (St. Peter's Cave Church, Cave-Church of St. Peter) near Antakya (Antioch), Turkey, is composed of a cave carved into the mountainside on Mount Starius with a depth of 13 m (42 ft.), a width of 9.5 m (31 ft.) and a height of 7 m (23 ft).

This cave is one of Christianity's oldest churches. The church reportedly is still intact after 2023 Turkey–Syria earthquake.

History

The oldest surviving parts of the church building date from at least the 4th or 5th century; these include some pieces of floor mosaics, and traces of frescoes on the right side of the altar.  The tunnel inside which opens to the mountainside is thought to have served the Christians for evacuation of the church in case of sudden raids and attacks.  Water which seeps from the nearby rocks was gathered inside to drink and to use for baptism; flow of this water, which visitors drank and collected to give to those who were ill (believing that it was healing and curative), has lessened as a result of recent earthquakes.

Crusaders of the First Crusade who captured Antakya in 1098 lengthened the church by a few meters and connected it with two arches to the facade, which they constructed.  Acting on orders from Pope Pius IX, Capuchin Friars restored the church and rebuilt the facade in 1863; French Emperor Napoleon III contributed to the restoration.  The remains to the left of the entrance belong to colonnades which formerly stood in front of the present facade.

Atop the stone altar in the middle of the church is a stonework platform placed in memory of Saint Peter's Platform Holiday, which was celebrated every 21 February in Antakya.  A marble statue of Saint Peter was placed above the altar in 1932.

The garden of the church has been used as a cemetery for hundreds of years.  Graves and burials have also been located inside the church, especially around the altar. The church is the burial place of Tancred, Prince of Galilee, as well as one of the three final resting places of the remains of the Holy Roman Emperor Frederick Barbarossa, who died in the Third Crusade.

The church is a museum today, but it is possible to perform worship services inside the church under the inspection of the Museum Management by obtaining a permit from the Office of the Provincial Governor. The church underwent restoration in 2013, with plans including repairs on the rock, construction of a service building and attempts to uncover fourth to fifth-century mosaics from the church’s earliest period.

Images

See also
Oldest churches in the world

References

External links 

Cave Church of St. Pierre
Church of Antioch
Antiochian Patriarchate
All About Turkey: Hatay
Catholic Encyclopedia: Saint Peter, Prince of Apostles

Churches in Turkey
New Testament places
Antakya
Buildings and structures in Hatay Province
World Heritage Tentative List for Turkey
Crusader churches
Cave churches
Buildings damaged by the 2023 Turkey–Syria earthquake